Natalie Sorokin (also Sorokine; 1921–1967) was a French woman who had relations with Simone de Beauvoir and Jean-Paul Sartre. Beauvoir was suspended from her teaching job after seducing her 17-year-old lycée pupil in 1939. Sorokin, along with Bianca Lamblin and Olga Kosakiewicz, later stated that their relationships with Sartre and de Beauvoir damaged them psychologically.

Existential life with Simone de Beauvoir
In June 1943 Sorokin's mother complained to the school authorities that Beauvoir had led her daughter astray. Beauvoir was accused of behavior leading to the corruption of a minor and her teaching license was suspended for the rest of her life. Sorokin later said her relationship with Beauvoir and Sartre came to an end when she found this relationship serving only one party.

Later life
After recovering from her trauma, Sorokin started writing and worked for radio. She later married Ivan Moffat, a friend of Beauvoir and Sartre's and son of the British actress and poet Iris Tree and artist and photographer Curtis Moffat. Their marriage was brief and produced one daughter.

See also
 Olga Kosakiewicz
 Bianca Lamblin

References

1926 births
1967 deaths
French emigrants to the United States